A prime gap is the difference between two successive prime numbers. The n-th prime gap, denoted gn or g(pn) is the difference between the (n + 1)-st and the n-th prime numbers, i.e.

We have g1 = 1, g2 = g3 = 2, and g4 = 4. The sequence (gn) of prime gaps has been extensively studied; however, many questions and conjectures remain unanswered.

The first 60 prime gaps are:
1, 2, 2, 4, 2, 4, 2, 4, 6, 2, 6, 4, 2, 4, 6, 6, 2, 6, 4, 2, 6, 4, 6, 8, 4, 2, 4, 2, 4, 14, 4, 6, 2, 10, 2, 6, 6, 4, 6, 6, 2, 10, 2, 4, 2, 12, 12, 4, 2, 4, 6, 2, 10, 6, 6, 6, 2, 6, 4, 2, ... .

By the definition of gn every prime can be written as

Simple observations
The first, smallest, and only odd prime gap is the gap of size 1 between 2, the only even prime number, and 3, the first odd prime. All other prime gaps are even. There is only one pair of consecutive gaps having length 2: the gaps g2 and g3 between the primes 3, 5, and 7.

For any integer n, the factorial n! is the product of all positive integers up to and including n. Then in the sequence

 

the first term is divisible by 2, the second term is divisible by 3, and so on. Thus, this is a sequence of  consecutive composite integers, and it must belong to a gap between primes having length at least n.

However, prime gaps of n numbers can occur at numbers much smaller than n!. For instance, the first prime gap of size larger than 14 occurs between the primes 523 and 541, while 15! is the vastly larger number 1307674368000.

The average gap between primes increases as the natural logarithm of these primes, and therefore the ratio of the prime gap to the primes involved decreases (and is asymptotically zero).  This is a consequence of the prime number theorem. From a heuristic view, we expect the probability that the ratio of the length of the gap to the natural logarithm is greater than or equal to a fixed positive number k to be ; consequently the ratio can be arbitrarily large. Indeed, the ratio of the gap to the number of digits of the integers involved does increase without bound.  This is a consequence of a result by Westzynthius.

In the opposite direction, the twin prime conjecture posits that  for infinitely many integers n.

Numerical results
, the largest known prime gap with identified probable prime gap ends has length 7186572, with 208095-digit probable primes and merit M = 14.9985, found by Michiel Jansen using a sieve program developed by J. K. Andersen. The largest known prime gap with identified proven primes as gap ends has length 1113106 and merit 25.90, with 18662-digit primes found by P. Cami, M. Jansen and J. K. Andersen.

, the largest known merit value and first with merit over 40, as discovered by the Gapcoin network, is 41.93878373 with the 87-digit prime 293703234068022590158723766104419463425709075574811762098588798217895728858676728143227. The prime gap between it and the next prime is 8350.

The Cramér–Shanks–Granville ratio is the ratio of gn / (ln(pn))2. If we discard anomalously high values of the ratio for the primes 2, 3, 7, then the greatest known value of this ratio is 0.9206386 for the prime 1693182318746371.

We say that gn is a maximal gap, if gm < gn for all m < n.
 the largest known maximal prime gap has length 1550, found by Bertil Nyman. It is the 80th maximal gap, and it occurs after the prime 18361375334787046697. The sequence of maximal gaps up to the nth prime is conjectured to have about  terms (see table below).

Further results

Upper bounds
Bertrand's postulate, proven in 1852, states that there is always a prime number between k and 2k, so in particular pn&hairsp;+1 < 2pn, which means gn < pn&hairsp;.

The prime number theorem, proven in 1896, says that the average length of the gap between a prime p and the next prime will asymptotically approach ln(p), the natural logarithm of p, for sufficiently large primes. The actual length of the gap might be much more or less than this. However, one can deduce from the prime number theorem an upper bound on the length of prime gaps:

For every , there is a number  such that for all   
.

One can also deduce that the gaps get arbitrarily smaller in proportion to the primes: the quotient

Hoheisel (1930) was the first to show that there exists a constant θ < 1 such that

hence showing that

for sufficiently large n.

Hoheisel obtained the possible value 32999/33000 for θ. This was improved to 249/250 by Heilbronn, and to θ = 3/4 + ε, for any ε > 0, by Chudakov.

A major improvement is due to Ingham, who showed that for some positive constant c,

if  then  for any 

Here, O refers to the big O notation,  ζ denotes the Riemann zeta function and π the prime-counting function. Knowing that any c > 1/6 is admissible, one obtains that θ may be any number greater than 5/8.

An immediate consequence of Ingham's result is that there is always a prime number between n3 and (n + 1)3, if n is sufficiently large. The Lindelöf hypothesis would imply that Ingham's formula holds for c any positive number: but even this would not be enough to imply that there is a prime number between n2 and (n + 1)2 for n sufficiently large (see Legendre's conjecture). To verify this, a stronger result such as Cramér's conjecture would be needed.

Huxley in 1972 showed that one may choose θ = 7/12 = 0.58(3).

A result, due to Baker, Harman and Pintz in 2001, shows that θ may be taken to be 0.525.

In 2005, Daniel Goldston, János Pintz and Cem Yıldırım proved that

and 2 years later improved this to

In 2013, Yitang Zhang proved that

meaning that there are infinitely many gaps that do not exceed 70 million. A Polymath Project collaborative effort to optimize Zhang's bound managed to lower the bound to 4680 on July 20, 2013. In November 2013, James Maynard introduced a new refinement of the GPY sieve, allowing him to reduce the bound to 600 and show that for any m there exists a bounded interval with an infinite number of translations each of which containing m prime numbers. Using Maynard's ideas, the Polymath project improved the bound to 246; assuming the Elliott–Halberstam conjecture and its generalized form, the bound has been reduced to 12 and 6, respectively.

Lower bounds
In 1931, Erik Westzynthius proved that maximal prime gaps grow more than logarithmically. That is,

In 1938, Robert Rankin proved the existence of a constant c > 0 such that the inequality

holds for infinitely many values of n, improving the results of Westzynthius and Paul Erdős.  He later showed that one can take any constant c < eγ, where γ is the Euler–Mascheroni constant. The value of the constant c was improved in 1997 to any value less than 2eγ.

Paul Erdős offered a $10,000 prize for a proof or disproof that the constant c in the above inequality may be taken arbitrarily large. This was proved to be correct in 2014 by Ford–Green–Konyagin–Tao and, independently, James Maynard.

The result was further improved to

for infinitely many values of n by Ford–Green–Konyagin–Maynard–Tao.

In the spirit of Erdős' original prize, Terence Tao offered US$10,000 for a proof that c may be taken arbitrarily large in this inequality.

Lower bounds for chains of primes have also been determined.

Conjectures about gaps between primes

Even better results are possible under the Riemann hypothesis. Harald Cramér proved that the Riemann hypothesis implies the gap gn satisfies

using the big O notation. (In fact this result needs only the weaker Lindelöf hypothesis, if one can tolerate an infinitesimally larger exponent.)
Later, he conjectured that the gaps are even smaller. Roughly speaking, Cramér's conjecture states that

Firoozbakht's conjecture states that  (where  is the nth prime) is a strictly decreasing function of n, i.e.,

If this conjecture is true, then the function  satisfies  It implies a strong form of Cramér's conjecture but is inconsistent with the heuristics of Granville and Pintz which suggest that  infinitely often for any  where  denotes the Euler–Mascheroni constant.

Meanwhile, Oppermann's conjecture is weaker than Cramér's conjecture. The expected gap size with Oppermann's conjecture is on the order of

As a result, under Oppermann's conjecture there exists  (probably ) for which every natural number  satisfies 

Andrica's conjecture, which is a weaker conjecture than Oppermann's, states that

This is a slight strengthening of Legendre's conjecture that between successive square numbers there is always a prime.

Polignac's conjecture states that every positive even number k occurs as a prime gap infinitely often. The case k = 2 is the twin prime conjecture. The conjecture has not yet been proven or disproven for any specific value of k, but Zhang Yitang's result proves that it is true for at least one (currently unknown) value of k which is smaller than  70,000,000; as discussed above, this upper bound has been improved to 246.

As an arithmetic function
The gap gn between the nth and (n + 1)st prime numbers is an example of an arithmetic function. In this context it is usually denoted dn and called the prime difference function. The function is neither multiplicative nor additive.

See also 

 Bonse's inequality
 Gaussian moat
 Twin prime

References

Further reading

External links
 Thomas R. Nicely, Some Results of Computational Research in Prime Numbers -- Computational Number Theory. This reference web site includes a list of all first known occurrence prime gaps.
 
 
 Armin Shams, Re-extending Chebyshev's theorem about Bertrand's conjecture, does not involve an 'arbitrarily big' constant as some other reported results.
 Chris Caldwell, Gaps Between Primes; an elementary introduction
 Andrew Granville, Primes in Intervals of Bounded Length; overview of the results obtained so far up to and including James Maynard's work of November 2013.

Arithmetic functions
Prime numbers